Batulamai Rajakumar is a Malaysian Olympic middle-distance runner. He represented his country in the men's 1500 meters and the men's 800 meters at the 1984 Summer Olympics. His time was a 3:55.19 in the 1500, and a 1:48.19 in the 800 heats.

References 

1964 births
Living people
Malaysian male middle-distance runners
Olympic athletes of Malaysia
Athletes (track and field) at the 1984 Summer Olympics
Southeast Asian Games medalists in athletics
Southeast Asian Games gold medalists for Malaysia